Derby is a small town situated in North West Province of South Africa that was named after the British Secretary of State Lord Derby. Derby began as a refuge for destitute people.

Village 117 km west-north-west of Johannesburg, 60 km south-west of Rustenburg and 17 km east of Koster. Laid out on portions of the farms Rietfontein and Vlakfontein, it was named after Lord Derby, British Secretary of State.

References

Populated places in the Kgetlengrivier Local Municipality